WWDR (1080 AM) is a radio station broadcasting a news/talk format. Licensed to Murfreesboro, North Carolina, United States, the station is currently owned by Byrne Acquisition Group, LLC.  The call letters were the one alternate after the FCC turned down the original five requested call letters.  WWDR stands for the first names of the station's founders, "We're  Wally, Don & Ray...WWDR. WWDR simulcasts the programming of WSMY,Weldon, North Carolina.  The stations are branded as News Talk 97.1 - 105.9.  The stations carry sports news and talk programming from Fox News Radio, Fox Sports Radio, Compass Media Networks, and Premiere Networks.  They also carry Roanoke Rapids High School Football, NC State University Sports and Washington Redskins Football.  

1080 AM is a United States clear-channel frequency, on which KOAN, KRLD, and WTIC share Class A status.  WWDR must leave the air from sunset to sunrise to prevent nighttime skywave interference to those Class A stations.

References

External links

WDR
Radio stations established in 1965
1965 establishments in North Carolina
WDR